The Courtauld Gallery is an art museum in Somerset House, on the Strand in central London. It houses the collection of the Courtauld Institute of Art, a self-governing college of the University of London specialising in the study of the history of art.

The Courtauld collection was formed largely through donations and bequests and includes paintings, drawings, sculptures and other works from medieval to modern times; it is particularly known for its French Impressionist and Post-Impressionist paintings. The collection contains some 530 paintings and over 26,000 drawings and prints. The head of the Courtauld Gallery is Ernst Vegelin. The gallery closed on 3 September 2018 for a major redevelopment, called Courtauld Connects, and reopened on 19 November 2021.

History

The Courtauld Institute was founded in 1932 through the philanthropic efforts of the industrialist and art collector Samuel Courtauld, the diplomat and collector Lord Lee of Fareham, and the art historian Sir Robert Witt.

The art collection at the Courtauld was begun by Samuel Courtauld, who in the same year presented an extensive collection of paintings, mainly French Impressionist and Post-Impressionist works. He made further gifts later in the 1930s and a bequest in 1948.

His collection included Manet's A Bar at the Folies-Bergère and a version of the Déjeuner sur l'Herbe, Renoir's La Loge, landscapes by Claude Monet and Camille Pissarro, a ballet scene by Edgar Degas, and a group of eight major works by Cézanne. Other paintings include Vincent van Gogh's Self-Portrait with Bandaged Ear  and Peach Blossoms in the Crau, Gauguin's Nevermore and Te Rerioa, and important works by Seurat, Henri "le Douanier" Rousseau, Toulouse-Lautrec and Modigliani.

Further bequests were added after the Second World War, most notably the collection of Old Master paintings assembled by Lord Lee, a founder of the institute. This included Cranach's Adam and Eve and a sketch in oils by Peter Paul Rubens for what is arguably his masterpiece, the Deposition altarpiece in Antwerp Cathedral.

Sir Robert Witt, also a founder of the Courtauld Institute, was an outstanding benefactor and bequeathed his important collection of Old Master and British drawings in 1952. His bequest included 20,000 prints and more than 3000 drawings. His son, Sir John Witt, later gave more English watercolours and drawings to the Gallery.

In 1958, Pamela Diamand, the daughter of Roger Fry (1866–1934), the eminent art critic and founder of the Omega Workshops, donated his collection of 20th-century art including works by Bloomsbury Group artists Vanessa Bell and Duncan Grant.

In 1966, Mark Gambier-Parry, son of Major Ernest Gambier-Parry, bequeathed the diverse collection of art formed by his grandfather, Thomas Gambier Parry, which ranged from Early Italian Renaissance painting to majolica, medieval enamel and ivory carvings, and other types of art (see section below).

Dr William Wycliffe Spooner (1882–1967) and his wife Mercie added to the Gallery's collection of English watercolours in 1967 with a bequest of works by John Constable, John Sell Cotman, Alexander and John Robert Cozens, Thomas Gainsborough, Thomas Girtin, Samuel Palmer, Thomas Rowlandson, Paul Sandby, Francis Towne, J. M. W. Turner, Peter De Wint and others.

In 1974, a group of thirteen watercolours by Turner was presented in memory of Sir Stephen Courtauld, who restored Eltham Palace, and the brother of Samuel Courtauld.

In 1978 the Courtauld received the Princes Gate Collection of Old Master paintings and drawings formed by Count Antoine Seilern. The collection rivals the Samuel Courtauld Collection in importance. It includes paintings by Bernardo Daddi, Robert Campin, Bruegel, Quentin Matsys, Van Dyck and Tiepolo, but is strongest in the works of Rubens. The bequest also included a group of 19th- and 20th‑century works by Pissarro, Edgar Degas, Pierre-Auguste Renoir and Oskar Kokoschka.

More recently the Lillian Browse and Alastair Hunter collections have given the Courtauld more late 19th- and 20th‑century paintings, drawings and sculptures.

A collection of more than 50 British watercolours, including eight by Turner, was left to the Gallery by Dorothy Scharf in 2004.

The gallery closed on 3 September 2018 until 19 November 2021 for a major redevelopment costing £50M.

The Courtauld Gallery is part of the Monuments Men and Women Museum Network, launched in 2021 by the Monuments Men Foundation for the Preservation of Art.

Location

From 1958 to 1989 the Courtauld collection was housed in part of the premises of the Warburg Institute in Woburn Square; it was thus separated from the Courtauld Institute, which was in Home House, Portman Square.

Since 1989 it has been housed, together with the Courtauld Institute, in the North or Strand block of Somerset House, in the rooms designed and purpose-built by Sir William Chambers for the learned societies, namely the Royal Academy (of which Chambers was the first Treasurer), the Royal Society and the Society of Antiquaries.

The Royal Academy occupied them from their completion in 1780 until it moved to the new National Gallery building in Trafalgar Square in 1837. Inscribed over the entrance to the Great Room, in which the annual Royal Academy summer exhibition was held, is the formidable inscription ΟΥΔΕΙΣ ΑΜΟΥΣΟΣ ΕΙΣΙΤΩ ("Let no stranger to the Muses enter" in Ancient Greek).

Highlights of the collection

Paintings

Dutch School
Vincent van Gogh – 3 paintings;

Early Netherlandish
Robert Campin (or Master of Flemalle), the Seilern Triptych
Quentin Matsys – 2 paintings;

English School
William Beechey – 2 paintings;
Thomas Gainsborough – 2 paintings;
Peter Lely – 3 paintings;

Flemish School
Anthony van Dyck – 5 paintings;
Pieter Bruegel the Elder – 2 paintings, many drawings;
Peter Paul Rubens – 29 paintings;
David Teniers the Younger – 10 paintings;

French School
Paul Cézanne – 12 paintings;
Edgar Degas – 6 paintings;
Paul Gauguin – 3 paintings;
Claude Lorrain – 1 painting;
Édouard Manet – 4 paintings;
Claude Monet – 3 paintings;
Camille Pissarro –  4 paintings;
Alfred Sisley – 2 paintings;
Georges-Pierre Seurat – 9 paintings;
Pierre-Auguste Renoir – 4 paintings;
Chaïm Soutine – 1 painting;
Henri de Toulouse-Lautrec – 2 paintings;
Henri Rousseau – 1 painting;

German School
Lucas Cranach the Elder – 1 painting;

Italian School
Fra Angelico – 4 paintings;
Giovanni Bellini – 1 painting;
Sandro Botticelli – 1 painting;
Bernardo Daddi – 2 paintings;
Lorenzo Lotto – 2 paintings;
Lorenzo Monaco – 2 paintings;
Pietro Perugino – 1 painting;
Pesellino – a diptych
Parmigianino – 2 paintings;
Giovanni Battista Tiepolo – 12 paintings;
Tintoretto – 2 paintings;

Spanish School
Francisco Goya – 1 painting;

Gambier-Parry Collection
 
Thomas Gambier Parry (1816–1888) was a keen and versatile collector for most of his adult life. Many of his purchases were made on trips to the continent, especially Italy, but he also bought from dealers and auctions in England, and sometimes sold items.

His most important collections were of late medieval and Early Renaissance paintings, small sculpted reliefs, ivories, and maiolica, but he also had a significant early collection of Islamic metalwork, and a variety of other types of objects, for example Hispano-Moresque ware, glass and three small post-Byzantine wooden crosses from Mount Athos elaborately carved with miniature scenes.

The Courtauld Gallery website shows images and descriptions of 324 objects from the 1966 bequest, which included the bulk of the collection.

Gambier Parry began by collecting mostly 16th- and 17th-century works, but his focus gradually moved to 14th- and 15th-century works, still relatively little collected, although Prince Albert was among British collectors of "Italian Primitives", as Trecento paintings were then known. Among his most important paintings were a Coronation of the Virgin by Lorenzo Monaco, one of the larger works in the collection, three predella panels with roundels of Christ and saints by Fra Angelico, and a small but important diptych of the Annunciation by Pesellino.  There are two further predella panels by Lorenzo Monaco, and many other small panels by lesser-known masters.  Later Renaissance works include ones by Il Garofalo, Sassoferrato, and there is a Baroque Assumption by Francesco Solimena.  There are a number of illuminated manuscript pages from the workshop of the Boucicaut Master.

The sculptures include three fine 15th-century marble reliefs of the Virgin and Child, the most significant by Mino da Fiesole. There is a Limoges enamel book cover panel, a number of Renaissance Limoges items, and several small Gothic ivories.

Gallery

Resources

The Courtauld publishes an online image collection, artandarchitecture.org.uk, which provides access to more than 40,000 images, including paintings and drawings from The Courtauld Gallery, and over 35,000 photographs of architecture and sculpture from the Conway Library of the institute. The site was developed with the support of the New Opportunities Fund.

Two other websites courtauldimages.com and courtauldprints.com sell high resolution digital files to scholars, publishers and broadcasters, and photographic prints to the general public.

References 

Courtauld Institute of Art
Museums of the University of London
1932 establishments in England
Photo archives in the United Kingdom
1932 in art